

nextbike is a German company that develops and operates public bike-sharing systems. The company was founded in Leipzig, Germany, in 2004. It operates in cities in 25 countries including Germany, UK, New Zealand, Poland, Croatia, the Czech Republic, Austria, Switzerland, Ukraine, and the United States. The headquarters with about 100 employees are based in Leipzig. The bicycles and stations are maintained by local service partners. Since 2021, nextbike GmbH has been a wholly owned subsidiary of TIER Mobility. As part of the merger, nextbike turned into the joint brand nextbike by TIER.

The bike sharing schemes can be initiated by cities and franchise partners. The operating costs are financed by contracts with public transport providers & municipalities, rental fees and the sale of advertising space on the bikes themselves. nextbike also provides mobility programmes for colleges or universities and companies. Their bike sharing service can be used as an elementary component of urban and regional mobility in over 300 cities worldwide.

Usage 
Bicycle users are normally obtained through a subscription system, where each bike is locked to either itself or to a rental station. By scanning the QR code on the bike with the nextbike app bikes can be rented. The bikes can be returned via app, hotline, terminal. There are cities with a flex zone allowing users to return the bike anywhere within a defined area for a small additional fee.

Projects

National projects 
nextbike operates in German cities such as Berlin, Düsseldorf, Frankfurt am Main, Hamburg, Leipzig, Munich, Nuremberg and Dresden. The biggest implementations of the system in Germany are in Ruhr, with 3,000 bikes, and Berlin with 5000 bikes. Besides large cities, nextbike also serves about several smaller German cities, like Bonn, where it has 900 bikes.

KVB-Rad
Since 2015 nextbike together with the public transport company of Cologne offer around 1500 bikes for rent. They are available everywhere within the flex zone and complement the public transport system. In 2021 the system will be renewed with 3000 bikes of the latest generation. The flex zone will be complemented with stations outside of the city center.

Metropolradruhr
metropolradruhr was launched in 2010 as one of the biggest regional bike sharing system in Germany. It links ten cities such as Dortmund, Bochum, Essen and Oberhausen. Bikes can be returned in any of these ten cities.

VRNnextbike
In 2015 nextbike together with the Verkehrsverbund Rhein-Neckar launched another cross-city bike sharing system with more than 2000 bikes connecting Mannheim, Heidelberg, Ludwigshafen and since 2016 also Bensheim and Speyer and many other cities. nextbike cooperates with local universities and colleges offering special conditions for students.

International projects 
At an international level, nextbike operates in Austria, Switzerland, the Netherlands, Latvia, Poland, New Zealand, Turkey, Bulgaria, Bosnia and Herzegovina, Croatia, Cyprus, the Czech Republic, Dubai, Hungary, Ukraine, the United Kingdom, and the United States. Two of the biggest public bike rental schemes operated by nextbike are Veturilo in Warsaw with 5 292 bikes and MOL BuBi in Budapest.

In 2014, several bike sharing schemes were launched in the UK, including the cities of Bath, Glasgow, Milton Keynes and Stirling. In April 2015 a new public hire scheme was launched in Belfast, branded Belfast Bikes. A scheme was launched in Cardiff in May 2018. The contract for the Bath bike sharing scheme ended in February 2019, and the bikes were no longer available to hire from the 8 February 2019. Described as Nextbike's "flagship scheme" in the UK, the Cardiff bikes were used even more often during the pandemic in 2020.

Schemes in the United States include Pittsburgh, Pennsylvania, West Palm Beach, Florida and Hudson County, New Jersey.

Gallery

See also 

 List of bicycle sharing systems

References

External links 

 Official website with English content
 International company website

Bicycle sharing companies
Transport companies established in 2004
Companies based in Leipzig